Khalihenna Ould-Errachid (Khalihuna Walad Al-Rashid) is a Sahrawi Moroccan politician. He is the president of the Royal Advisory Council for Saharan Affairs (CORCAS), a Moroccan government body supporting Morocco's claim on Western Sahara.

Biography

Early life 
Khalihenna Ould-Errachid was born in 1951 in a tent near Laayoune to an influential family in the Reguibat tribe. In the 1960s, he attended reunions with Muhammad Bassiri and was part of the Zemla Intifada.

Political career 
In 1974, Ould-Errachid started the pro-spanish Sahrawi National Union Party (PUNS). The PUNS, which had been created with the approval of the Spanish authorities, was the only authorized political party in Spanish Sahara (also in the rest of Spain, except the ruling Falange movement) between 1974 to 1975, had been created to counter the territorial claims from neighbours Morocco and Mauritania, as well as the Sahrawi nationalism Polisario Front, created in 1973.

In April 1975, during a press conference in Paris, Ould-Errachid declared that "if it weren't for phosphates, nobody would vindicate the territory. What Morocco seeks is not the Sahrawi welfare, but the exploitation of phosphates. We want independence, and the circumstance is given that in the future state of Western Sahara there are phosphates deposits."

Under Hassan II 

During the United Nations visiting mission to Spanish Sahara in May–June 1975, and before the Madrid Agreement, Ould-Errachid fled from El Aaiún to Las Palmas, and then took another plane to Morocco. Few days after, on May 19, Ould-Errachid declared his allegiance to the King of Morocco, Hassan II in Fez. Ould-Errachid claims that he helped organize the Green March in 1975. Several sources alleged that he left Western Sahara with between 160,000 and 6,000,000 pesetas taken from a bank account linked to PUNS. Under King Hassan II, he was appointed in 1977 as Minister of Saharan Affairs, and later as mayor (President of the Municipal Council) of Laayoune from 1983 until 2006, when he was succeeded by his brother, Moulay Hamdi Ould Errachid.

He was viewed as very close to the King Hassan's right-hand man, the minister of interior Driss Basri, who held responsibility for the Saharan territories, where Polisario waged a guerrilla war against Morocco until the 1991 cease-fire (still in effect, pending final resolution of the conflict). Following the death of King Hassan in 1999, and the dismissal of Basri by the new king Mohammed VI's new government a few years later, Ould-Errachid believed his political career was over.

Under Mohammed VI 

In 2006, King Mohammed VI created the Royal Advisory Council for Saharan Affairs (CORCAS) to promote Morocco's autonomy plan. As head of the royal council, Khalihenna Ould-Errachid made a public comeback, and was featured prominently in Moroccan diplomacy.

Khalihenna Ould-Errachid considers the Polisario Front as an obstacle to a peaceful solution due to what he saw as deep dependency on Algeria. The Polisario refuses to acknowledge CORCAS and refuses Morocco's autonomy plan, opting for full independence instead.

In 2008, a transcript from a 2005 Equity and Reconciliation Commission meeting regarding the Western Sahara War was leaked to Al-Jarida al-Oula, during the meeting, Ould-Errachid declared that "there are some people [...], about three or four Army officers who have committed what can be called war crimes against prisoners outside the scope of the war" and that "many civilians were thrown from helicopters or buried alive".

See also 
CORCAS
History of Western Sahara
Sahrawi National Union Party

Further reading 
 Hodges, Tony (1983), Western Sahara: The Roots of a Desert War, Lawrence Hill Books
Pazzanita, Anthony G. and Hodges, Tony (1994), Historical Dictionary of Western Sahara, Scarecrow Press

References

Living people
Moroccan politicians
Sahrawi National Union Party politicians
1951 births
Members of the Reguibat tribe